Little Cathead Mountain is a summit located in the Adirondack Mountains of New York located in the Town of Benson northeast of the hamlet of Upper Benson.

References

Mountains of Hamilton County, New York
Mountains of New York (state)